Tirra Lirra by the River is a Miles Franklin Award-winning novel by Australian author Jessica Anderson. Though written some years before, it was first published in 1978.  It is included in Carmen Callil and Colm Tóibín's collection The Modern Library: The Best 200 Novels in English since 1950 (Picador 1999. ).

Plot synopsis
For Nora Porteous, life is a series of escapes. To escape her tightly knit small-town family, she marries, only to find herself confined again, this time in a stifling Sydney suburb with a selfish, sanctimonious husband. With a courage born of desperation and sustained by a spirited sense of humor, Nora travels to London, and it is there that she becomes the woman she wants to be. Or does she?

Quotes:
"Finely honed structurally and tightly textured, it's a wry, romantic story that should make Anderson's American reputation and create a demand for her other work." - The Washington Post
"There may be a better novel than Tirra Lirra by the River this year, but I doubt it." - Cleveland Plain Dealer
"Subtle, rich, and seductive, this beautifully written novels casts a spell of delight upon the reader." Library Journal

Cultural references

The book's title is taken from Alfred, Lord Tennyson's poem, "The Lady of Shalott". That particular line comes from part 3, stanza 4:

From the bank and from the river
He flashed into the crystal mirror,
'Tirra lirra,' by the river
Sang Sir Lancelot.

References

Further reading
 Bird, Delys. "Review of Tirra Lirra by the River by Jessica Anderson." Westerly 25 (1980): 78–80.
 Haynes, Roslyn. "Art as Reflection in Jessica Anderson's Tirra Lirra by the River". Australian Literary Studies 12 (1986): 316–323.
 Sheridan, Susan. "Tirra Lirra and Beyond: Jessica Anderson's Truthful Fictions." Australian Book Review 324 (2010): 47–49.

External links
 Middlemiss.org
 Romantic quotes

1978 Australian novels
Miles Franklin Award-winning works
Novels set in Sydney
Novels set in London
Novels by Jessica Anderson
Novels set in Brisbane